Dorintosh is a village in the Canadian province of Saskatchewan within the Rural Municipality of Meadow Lake No. 588 and Census Division No. 17.

The village name is a portmanteau of the names of two members of parliament for North Battleford: Dorise Nielsen (1940–45) and Cameron Ross McIntosh (1925-40).

The Meadow Lake Provincial Park is directly north of Dorintosh along Highway 4.

History 
Dorintosh incorporated as a village on January 1, 1989.

Demographics 

See also 

 List of communities in Saskatchewan
 Villages of Saskatchewan

References

Villages in Saskatchewan
Meadow Lake No. 588, Saskatchewan
Division No. 17, Saskatchewan